The Hotel Riviera del Pacífico was a hotel located in Ensenada, Baja California, Mexico. It was one of the most prestigious and luxurious hotels in Mexico.

History

The hotel opened with great fanfare in 1930 but was not a real success until the early 1950s. It finally closed in 1964.

Origins
Prohibition sent North Americans south of their border in search of entertainment and alcohol, developing first Tijuana, then Rosarito, and finally Ensenada as tourist destinations.

The Ensenada Beach Club, S.A. was formed with the goal to build a resort in Ensenada. After the Club dissolved in 1926, a number of its members joined a new company, Club Internationale, S.A., to continue the project, initially called the Hotel Playa de Ensenada (Ensenada Beach Hotel). Architect Gordon F. Mayer was hired to design the hotel; Alfredo Ramos Martínez was hired to do its murals. The Playa Ensenada Hotel and Casino opened on October 31, 1930 with spectacular festivities, including the Xavier Cugat band, under the de facto management of boxer Jack Dempsey.

Decline
The hotel was never a financial success, however, partly because the road from the United States was poor, and the end of Prohibition proved fatal. The hotel only ever operated intermittently, and was put to military use during the Second World War.

Revival and final closure
After the end of the War, one of the original shareholders, Jerome Utley of Detroit, by then an old man and the only remaining shareholder, gave the hotel to a young lady with whom he was in love, Marjorie King Plant. Plant ran the hotel successfully with her Mexican lawyer and husband, Alfonso Rocha, changing its name to Hotel Riviera del Pacífico. Utley had been led to believe that Plant's marriage to Rocha was a "white marriage," that is a marriage of convenience serving only to give Plant the Mexican citizenship she needed to run the hotel, and when he discovered that this was not the case, he pursued Plant and then Rocha with court cases, leading first to Plant's leaving the hotel for the United States and then to Rocha's absconding from the hotel in 1956 to avoid a judgment against him. At this point the hotel was taken over by the Mexican government, which closed and partly demolished it in 1964.

The Margarita
The Margarita is claimed to have been invented in several different places and at several different times. One claim is that it was invented at the Hotel Riviera del Pacífico for Marjorie King Plant at the time when she was the joint owner. Other versions refer to Marjorie King, an actress, and some move the location from Ensenada to Tijuana. Margarita is a Spanish version of the name Marjorie.

According to an article in the Los Angeles Times, the Margarita was invented in the 1940s by Carlos Daniel "Danny" Herrera.

Colonial Californiano 
It is debated that this style emerged in United States California in the first half of the 20th century, however there are those who claim that this unique style occurred after the construction of the famous Riviera hotel in Ensenada, in the California that remained on the Mexican side.

Current status 
Partly rebuilt in 1978, the hotel was reopened as the Centro Social, Cívico y Cultural de Ensenada. This includes an open-air theater, a historical museum, a cantina, and a number of rooms used for a variety of functions.

See also

 List of hotels in Mexico
 List of companies of Mexico

References 

Hotel buildings completed in 1930
Hotel Riviera Del Pacifico
Defunct hotels
Hotels disestablished in 1964
Hotels established in 1930
Hotels in Mexico
Ensenada, Baja California
Tourist attractions in Ensenada, Baja California
Demolished buildings and structures in Mexico
Buildings and structures demolished in 1964
Landmarks in Ensenada